Speleoticus is a spider genus in the family Nesticidae. Its species are found in Japan and China.

Species 
Speleoticus comprises the following species, per the World Spider Catalog:
 Speleoticus globosus (Liu & Li, 2013) — China
 Speleoticus libo (Chen & Zhu, 2005) — China
 Speleoticus navicellatus (Liu & Li, 2013) — China
 Speleoticus uenoi (Yaginuma, 1972) — Japan
 Speleoticus yinchangminae Li, 2016 — China

Notes and references 

Nesticidae
Araneomorphae genera
Spiders of Asia